The imperial election of 20 September 1410 was an imperial election held to select the emperor of the Holy Roman Empire.

Background 
The previous Holy Roman Emperor, Rupert, King of Germany, died on 18 May 1410.  Three of the prince-electors of the Holy Roman Empire convened to elect Sigismund of Luxembourg, king of Hungary and son of a previous emperor, Charles IV. They were

1. Frederick I, Elector of Brandenburg, burgrave of Nuremberg, who claimed to act on behalf of Jobst of Moravia, elector of Brandenburg and Rupert's nephew, without his knowledge or consent. 

2. Louis III, Elector Palatine.

3. Werner von Falkenstein, Archbishop of Trier.

Result 
Sigismund was elected.

Aftermath 
The remaining four electors, as well as Jobst himself, did not accept the election of Sigismund.  They elected Jobst emperor at the imperial election of October 1, 1410.

External links

1409
1410 in the Holy Roman Empire
15th-century elections
Non-partisan elections
Sigismund, Holy Roman Emperor